Moahni Moahna is a Swedish band that was created in the early 1990s by guitarist Henrik Flyman (Evil Masquerade, Lacrimosa, Wuthering Heights, ZooL) and guitarist Tommy Rehn. They wrote and performed their own brand of hard rock/heavy metal that was described as "Fantasy Metal". The band started as a two piece formation with hired session musicians, but they soon added vocalist Martin Häggström as a steady member.

Discography
Studio albums
Temple of Life (1994)
Why (1996)

Singles & EPs
Face the Light (1992)
Queen Shamar (1994)

Videography
Radio's to Blame (1997)

Band members
Henrik Flyman – guitars, bass, keyboard
Tommy Rehn – guitars, bass, keyboard
Martin Häggström – vocals

Various session musicians have collaborated with the band.

History
A Moahni Moahna memorial website is available where more material can be found (such as biography and photos).
Detailed information about the music can be found in the discography section of Henrik Flyman Official website.

The band has not been heard from since 1997 when they gave their last live performance as support to Deep Purple in Sweden. No official statement has been made about ending Moahni Moahna.

Henrik Flyman is now active in Evil Masquerade. Tommy Rehn is now active in Angtoria.

References

External links
Moahni Moahna (memorial website)
Henrik Flyman Official website
Evil Masquerade Official website
Angtoria Official website

Swedish heavy metal musical groups
Swedish symphonic metal musical groups